Andrew Mitchell (born 6 April 1992) is a Northern Irish professional association footballer who plays for NIFL Premiership side Carrick Rangers on loan from Larne.

He started his playing career at Greenisland F.C at the age of 8. He then joined Manchester City featuring in the academy u16, u18 age groups and the reserve team. At the age of 18 he then moved to Rangers. He then gained valuable experience signing for Annan Athletic, initially on loan, then signing permanently after spending five years at Rangers. He moved to Southport in July 2014. On Friday 24 January 2020 Larne Announced the signing of Mitchell after he agreed his release from his contract with Linfield.

Style of play

He is known for having great passing ability. Mitchell can play in multiple positions due to his technical ability. Over his career he has featured both at full back and also anywhere in midfield.

Career
Mitchell began his career as a youth player with Northern Ireland side Greenisland. Mitchell was at Greenisland F.C. since he was 8 years old. Mitchell then moved to Premier League club Manchester City. He was a vital member in the under-18 side in the season of 2010. He was a big part of the Manchester City under–18 side that won the Al Ain International Championship in 2010, with a penalty shoot out, with Mitchell converting the winning penalty. Mitchell also reached the semi final of the Dallas Cup with City in 2009, being knocked out by São Paulo.

Mitchell then joined Scottish Premier League club Rangers in May 2010, initially as a member of the club's under 19–squad. He was promoted to the first team squad on 3 March 2012, where he was an unused substitute against Heart of Midlothian. He went on to make his first team debut on 17 March 2012, in a 2–1 defeat to Dundee United. Mitchell also featured another four times after that in the first team including being an unused substitute in the Old Firm match which was a 3–2 win for Rangers at Ibrox.

On 1 July 2012, Mitchell signed a new one-year contract with Rangers. He was captain of the reserve side that lifted the reserve league trophy. Mitchell's first start of the 2012–13 season came shortly after. Despite playing out of position, at right full-back, Mitchell was voted as Man of the Match in the fixture against Clyde on Saturday 13 April 2013. Mitchell also featured in five other first team matches towards the conclusion of the season earning a man of the match award against Berwick Rangers on the final day of the season.

On 13 September 2013, Mitchell signed for Scottish League Two side Annan Athletic on a 93-day loan. On 23 November he scored his first career goal in a 4–4 draw with Stirling Albion.

On 17 January 2014 Mitchell's contract with Rangers was terminated by mutual consent and he rejoined Annan on a permanent deal until the end of the 2013–14 season due to the two club rule.

On 19 July 2014, Mitchell joined Southport in the Conference Premier.

On 2 February 2015, Mitchell joined Annan on loan to the end of the season for the third time.

On 25 May 2015, Mitchell sign for Crusaders.

Career statistics

Honours
Rangers
Scottish Third Division: 2012–13

Crusaders
NIFL Premiership: 2015–16

Linfield
NIFL Premiership: 2018-19
Northern Ireland Football League Cup: 2018-19

Larne
County Antrim Shield: (2) 2020-21, 2021-22

References

External links

1992 births
Living people
Sportspeople from County Antrim
Association footballers from Northern Ireland
Association football midfielders
Manchester City F.C. players
Rangers F.C. players
Annan Athletic F.C. players
Southport F.C. players
Crusaders F.C. players
Linfield F.C. players
Scottish Premier League players
Scottish Football League players
Scottish Professional Football League players
Northern Ireland youth international footballers
Larne F.C. players